Oncomodulin 2, also known as OCM2, is a human gene that is similar to oncomodulin.

Oncomodulin is a high-affinity calcium ion-binding protein. It belongs to the superfamily of calmodulin proteins, also known as the EF-hand proteins. Oncomodulin 2 is an oncodevelopmental protein found in early embryonic cells in the placenta and also in tumors.

References

Further reading